Events from the year 1717 in Scotland.

Incumbents 

 Secretary of State for Scotland: The Duke of Roxburghe

Law officers 
 Lord Advocate – Sir David Dalrymple, 1st Baronet
 Solicitor General for Scotland – Sir James Stewart, Bt (possibly jointly with Robert Dundas)

Judiciary 
 Lord President of the Court of Session – Lord North Berwick
 Lord Justice General – Lord Ilay
 Lord Justice Clerk – Lord Grange

Events 
 1 January – Count Carl Gyllenborg, the Swedish ambassador to Great Britain, is arrested in London over a plot to assist the Pretender James Francis Edward Stuart.
 February – as part of the Triple Alliance treaty between Britain and France, James Stuart leaves France and seeks refuge with the Pope.
 July – Indemnity Act frees most Jacobites from imprisonment. The Clan Gregor are specifically excluded.
 Horse post introduced between Glasgow, Edinburgh and points north.
 Drummonds Bank is founded in London by Scottish goldsmith Andrew Drummond.
 Approximate date – the seminary at Scalan begins to train Roman Catholic priests.

Births 
 28 February – Alexander Colville, 7th Lord Colville of Culross, British Royal Navy admiral (died 1770)
 28 June – Matthew Stewart, mathematician (died 1785)
 29 June (bapt.) – James Robertson, British Army officer, governor of New York (died 1788 in London)
 July – William Duncan, natural philosopher and classicist (died 1760)
 10 October – Sir Archibald Edmonstone, 1st Baronet, politician (died 1807 in London)
 3 November – Thomas Miller, Lord Glenlee, judge and politician (died 1789)

Deaths 
 19 March – John Campbell, 1st Earl of Breadalbane and Holland, royalist (born 1636)
 August – William Cochrane, Member of the Parliament of Great Britain (born after 1659)
 November – John Slezer, military engineer and topographical artist (born before 1650 perhaps in Germany)
 William Boyd, 3rd Earl of Kilmarnock, nobleman

See also 

 Timeline of Scottish history
 1717 in Great Britain

References 

 
Years of the 18th century in Scotland
Scotland
1710s in Scotland